Maximina Uepa (born 22 September 2002) is a weightlifter from Nauru. She won the bronze medal in the women's 76 kg event at the 2022 Commonwealth Games held in Birmingham, England. She is the current Nauruan women's record-holder in the 71kg category for overall, snatch and clean and jerk.

Biography 
Uepa was born on 22 September 2002 in Denig, Nauru. Her father, Jezza Uepa, and her brother, Maxius Uepa, are both successful powerlifters. Jezza Uepa won the 120kg+ class/super heavyweight class in the IPF World Powerlifting Championships in 2019. In 2015 she was the youngest competitor at the Commonwealth Youth Games, aged twelve years old. She competed in the 58kg weightlifting category.

In 2018 she was flagbearer for Nauru at the Summer Youth Olympics. She was recognised as Nauruan Sportsperson of the Year (Female) in 2018. She was a bronze medallist in the 63kg category at the Pacific Mini Games in 2017, only beaten by Mattie Sasser (gold) and Amanda Gould (silver). In 2019 she moved from the 63kg to the 71kg  category. She is the current Nauruan Olympic record-holder in the snatch, clean and jerk and overall; this record was set at the 2019 Pacific Games, where she also won two gold medals.

In August 2022, Uepa won the bronze medal in the women's 76 kg event at the 2022 Commonwealth Games held in Birmingham, England. She dedicated her medal to weightlifter Reanna Solomon, who died from COVID-19 in July 2022.

Nauruan records

Current

Historic (2002-2018) 

Medalbox note

References

External links

2002 births
Living people
Nauruan female weightlifters
People from Denigomodu District
Commonwealth Games bronze medallists for Nauru
Commonwealth Games medallists in weightlifting
Weightlifters at the 2022 Commonwealth Games
Medallists at the 2022 Commonwealth Games